J. Barney Sherry (March 4, 1874February 22, 1944) was an American actor of the silent film era. He appeared in more than 210 films between 1905 and 1929. He was born in Germantown, Pennsylvania and died in Philadelphia, Pennsylvania from cardiovascular disease.

Selected filmography

 War on the Plains (1912)
 Custer's Last Fight (1912)
 The Paymaster's Son (1913)
 The Battle of Gettysburg (1913)
 The Bargain (1914)
 The Beckoning Flame (1915)
 The Devil (1915)
 Aloha Oe (1915)
 The Green Swamp (1916)
 The Raiders (1916)
 The Stepping Stone (1916)
 The Millionaire Vagrant (1917)
 The Weaker Sex (1917)
 Madcap Madge (1917)
 Fanatics (1917)
 The Snarl (1917)
 The Iced Bullet (1917)
 The Fuel of Life (1917)
 The Gown of Destiny (1917)
 Love or Justice (1917)
 Blood Will Tell (1917)
 Borrowed Plumage (1917)
 The Stainless Barrier (1917)
 Ten of Diamonds (1917)
 Flying Colors (1917)
 Her Decision (1918)
 The Master Man (1919)
 Yvonne from Paris (1919)
 Restless Souls (1919)
 The Secret Code (1918)
 A Man's Fight (1919)
 A Gun Fightin' Gentleman (1919)
 The Lion Man (1919)
 The Black Gate (1919)
 The Mayor of Filbert (1919)
 Go and Get It (1920)
 Darling Mine (1920)
 The River's End (1920)
 Dinty (1920)
 The Forged Bride (1920)
 The Barbarian (1920)
 Man, Woman & Marriage (1921)
 Burn 'Em Up Barnes (1921)
 Just Outside the Door (1921)
  The Lotus Eater (1921)
 Back Pay (1922)
 What Fools Men Are (1922)
 Island Wives (1922)
 The Secrets of Paris (1922)
 When the Desert Calls (1922)
 Sure Fire Flint (1922)
 The Inner Man (1922)
 Notoriety (1922)
 A Woman's Woman (1922)
 Shadows of the Sea (1922)
 Till We Meet Again (1922)
 John Smith (1923)
 The White Sister (1923)
 Jacqueline (1923)
 Galloping Hoofs (1924)
 Miami (1924)
 Lend Me Your Husband (1924)
 The Warrens of Virginia (1924)
 Daughters Who Pay (1925)
 Enemies of Youth (1925)
 False Pride (1925)
 The Crackerjack (1925)
 The Live Wire (1925)
 A Little Girl in a Big City (1925)
 Play Ball (1925)
 Broken Homes (1926)
 Casey of the Coast Guard (1926)
 The Brown Derby (1926)
 Prince of Tempters (1926)
 The Crimson Flash (1927)
 Alex the Great (1928)
 The Wright Idea (1928)
 Broadway Scandals (1929)

References

External links

 

1874 births
1944 deaths
Male actors from Philadelphia
American male film actors
American male silent film actors
20th-century American male actors